David Craig Anderson Sr. is an American Anglican bishop. He is a suffragan bishop, retired, of the Convocation of Anglicans in North America and the Anglican Church in North America.

Anderson was a priest at the Episcopal Church of the United States, which he left after becoming disenchanted with their pro-homosexuality policies. He joined the Convocation of Anglicans in North America (CANA), the missionary body of the Church of Nigeria in the United States and Canada on All Saints Day, 1 November 2006. He was consecrated suffragan bishop of the CANA in 2007. He became also President and CEO of the American Anglican Council, destinated to reunite orthodox Anglicans in North America. He joined the Anglican Church in North America, upon his foundation, in June 2009, of which both CANA and AAC where founding bodies.

He is currently one of the eight bishops of CANA, as a suffragan bishop, though retired.

References

External links
David Anderson Data, CANA Official Website 

Living people
Bishops of the Anglican Church in North America
Year of birth missing (living people)
21st-century American clergy
Anglican realignment people